Ullathai Allitha is a 2022 Indian-Tamil-language family drama television series. Based on Kannada-language Colors Kannada's drama series Mithuna Raashi, it tells of a girl, Tamizh, whose family is going through financial crisis. Along with studies, she drives a taxi to support her family.

It starred Vaishnavi, Prithvi Raj and Swapna Treasa and produced by Ross Petals Entertainment Pvt Ltd. It premiered on Colors Tamil on 10 October 2022 and ended on 9 January 2023 with 68 episodes and was available for streaming in selected markets on Voot.

Plot
This is the story of Tamizh and Santhosh. Tamizh's life takes an unexpected turn when she reluctantly marries Santhosh, the arrogant owner of the cab company.

Cast

Main
 Vaishnavi as Tamizh (Auto Rani): a middle-class girl and auto driver.
 Prithvi Raj as Santhosh: A money minded CEO 
 Swapna Treasa as Rajeshwari

Supporting

Production

Release
The first promo was unveiled on 13 September 2022. The second promo was 1 October 2022, featuring protagonist Santhosh and Tamizh.

References

Colors Tamil original programming
Tamil-language romance television series
2022 Tamil-language television series debuts
Tamil-language television shows
Television shows set in Tamil Nadu
2023 Tamil-language television series endings
Tamil-language television series based on Kannada-language television series